The men's T47 (including T45 and T46 athletes) 100 metres competition of the athletics events at the 2015 Parapan American Games was held on August 10 at the CIBC Athletics Stadium. The defending T46 Parapan American Games champion was Yohansson Nascimento of Brazil.

Records
Prior to this competition, the existing records were as follows:

T45

T46/T47

Broken Records

T46/T47

Schedule
All times are Central Standard Time (UTC-6).

Results
Athletes are classified T47 unless indicated.
All times are shown in seconds.

Semifinals
The fastest three from each heat and next two overall fastest qualified for the final.

Semifinal 1
Wind +0.7 m/s

Semifinal 2
Wind +0.2 m/s

Final
Wind +0.5 m/s

References

Athletics at the 2015 Parapan American Games